Megan Dunn may refer to:
 Megan Dunn (cyclist), Australian racing cyclist
 Megan Dunn (British politician), British student union leader